The Smith, later Smith-Marriott Baronetcy, of Sydling St Nicholas in the County of Dorset, is a title in the Baronetage of Great Britain. It was created on 1 June 1774 for John Smith, High Sheriff of Dorset in 1772. The second Baronet married Elizabeth Anne, daughter of Reverend James Marriott. The fourth Baronet assumed by Royal sign-manual the additional surname of Marriott. The fifth Baronet was High Sheriff of Dorset in 1873.

Sir Edmund Charles Wyldbore Smith (1877–1938), son of Reverend Francis Smith, fourth son of the second Baronet, was a civil servant, diplomat, and businessman.

Smith, later Smith-Marriott baronets, of Sydling St Nicholas (1774)
Sir John Smith, 1st Baronet (1744–1807)
Sir John Wyldbore Smith, 2nd Baronet (1770–1852)
Sir John James Smith, 3rd Baronet (1800–1862)
Sir William Marriott Smith-Marriott, 4th Baronet (1801–1864)
Sir William Henry Smith-Marriott, 5th Baronet (1835–1924)
Sir William John Smith-Marriott, 6th Baronet (1870–1941)
Sir John Richard Wyldbore Smith-Marriott, 7th Baronet (1875–1942)
Sir William Smith-Marriott, 8th Baronet (1865–1943)
Sir Hugh Randolph Cavendish Smith-Marriott, 9th Baronet (1868–1944)
Sir Ralph George Cavendish Smith-Marriott, 10th Baronet (1900–1987)
Sir Hugh Cavendish Smith-Marriott, 11th Baronet (1925–2013)
Sir Peter Francis Smith-Marriott, 12th Baronet (born 1927)

The heir apparent is the present holder's son Martin Ralph Smith-Marriott (born 1962).

Notes

Smith-Marriott
1774 establishments in Great Britain